The Dr. Frank B. Kistner House, also known as the Kistner–Kalberer House, is a house located in southwest Portland, Oregon listed on the National Register of Historic Places.

See also
 National Register of Historic Places listings in Southwest Portland, Oregon

References

1930 establishments in Oregon
Houses completed in 1930
Houses on the National Register of Historic Places in Portland, Oregon
Portland Historic Landmarks
Southwest Hills, Portland, Oregon